Joan Chelimo Melly (born 10 November 1990) is a Kenyan and Romanian female long-distance runner who competes in road running competitions. She is the 2018 Prague Half Marathon Champion and the winner of other prestigious road races such as Berlin Half Marathon, Boston 10K and Boston Half Marathon.

Career
Chelimo ran 1500 metres while at school, going up to the National Championship level. She began to compete in small road races in 2011, mainly running in Spain and Morocco for the next 3 years. During that period, she won several races, including the Valencia 10K in a course record of 32:17 and the OCP 10K Int’l de Khouribga where she set a then 31:41 personal best over the 10K distance.

She ended her 2014 season with 3 consecutive victories, winning Wachau Half Marathon in 1:11:52, Swansea 10K and Cardiff Half Marathon.

Due to pregnancy, she skipped the 2015 season and returned to competition in September 2016 by placing sixth at the Kericho 10K.

Chelimo made a strong comeback on the international scene by winning the 2017 Berlin Half Marathon in 1:08:45. In May, she finished second at Le Puy-en-Velay 15K before winning Boston 10K in a new best of 31:24 In September, she ended up second at the Copenhagen Half Marathon after leading most of the race, clocking a new personal best of 1:06:25, the seventh fastest time of the year. She came back to Boston in October and won her second Boston Athletic Association event of the year by taking a commanding victory at the Boston Half Marathon in 1:10:31.

2018 started very well for Chelimo with a strong victory at the Elgeyo-Marakwet County Cross Country Championship. Three weeks later she became the ninth woman to ever run a half marathon under sixty-six minutes, finishing fourth at Ras Al Khaimah Half Marathon with a new personal best of 1:05:37 in a race widely regarded as the greatest women’s half marathon ever held. Following her excellent performances and after going out under world-record pace for about seventeen kilometers, Chelimo won the 2018 Prague Half Marathon in 1:05:04, becoming the 4th fastest women of all-time over the distance. In september, she ended-up third at the Copenhagen Half Marathon after taking out the race at world-record pace for fifteen kilometer and getting overtake by dutch athlete Sifan Hassan in the last two kilometers of the race. She then went on to win the 2018 Boston Half Marathon, defending her title and winning the race for the second consecutive time in 1:09:34. 
She won her last race of the season with ease at the Montferland Run.

Personal life
She is married and has a daughter named Ariana. She trains and lives in Iten.

Road race wins

Personal bests
5K – 14:51 (2018)
10K – 30:14 (2018)
15K – 45:54 (2018)
Half marathon – 1:05:04 (2018)

References

External links

All Athletics profile

1990 births
Living people
Kenyan female long-distance runners